Marguerite de Valois may refer to:
Marguerite de Valois, wife of Henry IV of France, daughter of Henry II of France
Marguerite de Navarre, also called Marguerite of Angoulême, sister of Francis I of France, wife of Henry II of Navarre
Marguerite, bâtarde de France, illegitimate daughter of Charles VI of France
Margaret of France, Duchess of Berry (1523–1574), sister of Henry II of France, daughter of Francis I of France